Qareh Qowzlu (also Romanized as Qareh Qowzlū; also known as Qareh Gowzlū) is a village in Marhemetabad-e Miyani Rural District, Marhemetabad District, Miandoab County, West Azerbaijan Province, Iran. At the 2006 census, its population was 702, in 177 families.

References 

Populated places in Miandoab County